Marija Tonković, married Pavićević, (born 23 November 1959) is a former basketball player who competed for Yugoslavia in the 1980 Summer Olympics.

References

1959 births
Living people
Basketball players from Rijeka
Serbs of Croatia
Yugoslav women's basketball players
Serbian women's basketball players
Olympic basketball players of Yugoslavia
Basketball players at the 1980 Summer Olympics
Olympic bronze medalists for Yugoslavia
Olympic medalists in basketball
ŽKK Voždovac players
Medalists at the 1980 Summer Olympics
Centers (basketball)